Sir Humphrey Style, 1st Baronet (–1659) of Beckenham, Kent was a courtier to kings James I and Charles I of England.

Biography
Humphrey was the son of William Style of Langley, Beckenham, Kent (grandson of Sir Humphrey Style, Esquire of the Body to Henry VIII). He was a Gentleman of the Privy Chamber to James I and cup-bearer to Charles I. He was a colonel of the trained bands of horse (cavalry) in Kent.

Sir Humphrey was knighted at Farnham by King James on 11 August 1622 and under that designation created a baronet of Ireland on 13 September 1624. Charles I created him a baronet of England on 20 May 1627.

Sir Humphrey died on 10 November 1659 in his 64th year and was buried at Beckenham. As he died without any children, the baronetcy became extinct. The Langley estate passed to his half-brother, William Style who resided there until his death in 1679.

Family
Sir Humphrey married Elizabeth, widow of Sir Robert Bosvile, of Eynesford, daughter and heiress of Robert Peshall, or Peeshall, of Eccleshall, Staffordshire, and of Lincoln's Inn, London. Elizabeth was buried 27 Nov 1641 at Beckenham. His second wife was Hester Wright daughter of Robert Wright Lord Bishop of Coventry & Lichfield & his wife Bridget (confirmed by Abstracts of Probate Acts in the Prerogative of Canterbury Vol iv 1646). After his death Hester married John Scott (c.1626–1670), a Gentleman of the Privy Chamber.

Notes

References

Attribution

1590s births
1659 deaths
Esquires of the Body
Gentlemen of the Privy Chamber
Baronets in the Baronetage of Ireland
Baronets in the Baronetage of England